Results Service was a British television programme that ran from October 1985 until the end of the 1991/92 football season on the ITV network late on Saturday afternoons during the football season.

History

The programme began as a segment in the long-running programme World of Sport, a sports magazine programme that aired on the ITV network from 2 January 1965 to 28 September 1985. At around 4:45pm, at around the time final whistles began to be blown at football matches across Britain, World of Sport would air 'Results Service', taking reports from major football matches before a full classified check read by Bob Colston.
 
Following World of Sport's demise, ITV committed itself to broadcast sport on Saturday afternoons, albeit as stand-alone programmes rather than as a magazine show. Typically, this would begin around midday with British wrestling (formerly a 4pm staple on World of Sport), followed by Saint and Greavsie, a football preview show and successor to the On the Ball segment of World of Sport. This would often be followed by an hour of non-sports programming, typically an American adventure series like Airwolf, which would be followed by a two-hour block of sports programming, usually snooker, darts, athletics, gymnastics, ice skating or hockey, after which, at 4:45pm, Results Service would air. Horse racing coverage, previously an integral part of World of Sport, continued as Channel 4 Racing on what was then ITV's sister channel, Channel 4.

Format

The programme was usually presented by Elton Welsby, who, at its beginning, was making a name for himself at ITV Sport having already become firmly-established as a presenter in the Granada TV region. In its early years, the theme tune was a variant of the 1983 World of Sport theme, though two other themes were used in later years. It began at 4:45pm and lasted 15 minutes.

Football was always the dominant sport covered in the programme, though until the 1988/89 season, results of other sports, especially rugby union, cricket and snooker, also featured. Following ITV's contract to live and exclusive coverage of the Football League from the start of the 1988/89 season, the programme focussed mostly, possibly entirely on football, and also included goal action from the day's matches, where video could be transported to the studios for broadcast in time.

Typically, the programme would begin with Welsby giving the latest scores, and in later years some goal action, followed by match reports from ITV commentators at the games, as well as from reporters working for various independent local radio stations around Britain, such as Tom Ross from BRMB or Richard Park from Radio Clyde. Bob Colston continued his role as reader of classified results throughout the programme's run, which he would do towards the end of the programme, after which Welsby would provide a run-down of the league tables and briefly preview the following Sunday's live match on ITV.

Demise and Aftermath

ITV lost the rights to top-flight football with the creation of the Premier League, and therefore the decision was made to end the programme at the conclusion of the 1991/92 season.

From the start of the 1992/93 seasons, several ITV regions broadcast their own programmes called 'Goals Extra', in the slot 'Results Service' occupied. Indeed, Welsby presented the Granada version of this programme for much of its run. 'Goals Extra' featured results and reports from the Premier League, but actual action was restricted to goals from the lower divisions, as ITV still had access to what remained of the Football League.

Much of the country did not have a Goals Extra programme, but ITV chose to incorporate a football round-up into the teatime news bulletin from ITN, which would normally be broadcast at or close to 5pm. At the end of the news segment, the newscaster would hand over to a sports specialist, usually Graham Miller for a brief round-up of the day's sports news, focussing heavily on football, at the end of which a full classified check would be read out, initially with Bob Colston continuing in his role, but for many years afterwards Miller or whoever was presenting the bulletin would read it.

The ITN teatime classified results check continued well into the new millennium, but from 1998, the newly-launched ITV2 had a programme called Football First, which ran throughout Saturday afternoons, giving goal updates, analysis and a results check. Some ITV regions (Anglia, Meridian and HTV) showed the latter part of the programme from 2000 onwards, albeit sporadically. In 2001, it was renamed The Goal Rush, was broadcast on the main ITV channel, but by now it went off air prior to a full classified check, which was still part of the ITN teatime news bulletin.

The Goal Rush was axed mid-season in 2003, and around this time ITN stopped providing a full classified check on the teatime news, though brief clips and major stories from the day's football remain. Viewers can still receive a full classified check on the BBC's Final Score programme and on Sky Sports programme Gillette Soccer Saturday.

1985 British television series debuts
1992 British television series endings
1980s British sports television series
1990s British sports television series
ITV Sport
ITV (TV network) original programming
English Football League on television